13th Airlift Squadron – also referred to as 13.ELTR - 13 Eskadra Lotnictwa Transportowego in Poland – is an airlift squadron of Polish Air Force established in 1963 in Kraków, Poland. The squadron is stationed in the 8th Air Base.

Equipment

Retired aircraft 
 Antonov An-26
 Antonov An-12
 Antonov An-2
 Iliushin Il-14

References

Squadrons of the Polish Air Force
Military units and formations established in 1963